Zvonimir Milić (born 20 February 1995) is a Croatian retired footballer who last played for HNK Cibalia in Prva HNL, on loan from HNK Hajduk Split, as a centre back.

Club career
Zvonimir Milić joined the HNK Hajduk Split academy in 2005, aged 10, after training for some time at the lower-tier NK Orkan. Progressing through the ranks, he became a regular in national selections as well, from U14 to U19, for which he debuted in April 2012, aged 17 years and 2 months. Unfortunately, a back injury halted his progress, making him lose the entire 2012/2013 season and putting into question his career. Nevertheless, he recovered and rejoined Hajduk's U19 team for the 2013/2014 season.

He made his first senior appearances in early 2014 on loan at the Treća HNL Jug side NK Junak Sinj, after he signed a professional contract with Hajduk. He rejoined Hajduk that summer and, on 24 August 2014, made his Prva HNL debut in a 0-2 loss against NK Osijek, after the coach Igor Tudor decided to rest several first-team players.

After featuring for the third-tier second team of Hajduk, another injury put him on the sidelines for the entire spring part of the season, and he was sent on loan to NK Junak Sinj again at the beginning of the 2015/16 season.

References

External links
 
Zvonimir Milić at hajduk.hr

1995 births
Living people
Footballers from Split, Croatia
Association football central defenders
Croatian footballers
Croatia youth international footballers
HNK Gorica players
HNK Hajduk Split players
NK Junak Sinj players
HNK Hajduk Split II players
HNK Šibenik players
HNK Cibalia players
First Football League (Croatia) players
Croatian Football League players